Juan Verón may refer to two Argentine footballers:

Juan Ramón Verón (born 1944), nicknamed La Bruja
Juan Sebastián Verón (born 1975), his son, nicknamed La Brujita